Geobacillus jurassicus is a thermophilic bacterium first isolated from a high-temperature petroleum reservoir. It is aerobic, gram-positive, rod-shaped, moderately thermophilic, chemoorganotrophic, and endospore-forming, with type species DS1T (=VKM B-2301T, =DSM 15726T).

References

Further reading
Nazina, T. N., et al. "[The phylogenetic diversity of aerobic organotrophic bacteria from the Dagan high-temperature oil field]." Mikrobiologiia 74.3 (2004): 401–409.
Rahman, Raja NZRA, et al. "Geobacillus zalihae sp. nov., a thermophilic lipolytic bacterium isolated from palm oil mill effluent in Malaysia." BMC Microbiology 7.1 (2007): 77.
Muñoz, Patricio A., et al. "Thermophilic bacteria present in a sample from Fumarole Bay, Deception Island." Antarctic Science 23.06 (2011): 549–555.
Kuisiene, Nomeda, et al. "Identification of the genus Geobacillus using genus-specific primers, based on the 16S–23S rRNA gene internal transcribed spacer." FEMS Microbiology Letters 277.2 (2007): 165–172.

External links

LPSN
Type strain of Geobacillus jurassicus at BacDive -  the Bacterial Diversity Metadatabase

Bacillaceae
Bacteria described in 2005